Chinese Camp is a census-designated place (CDP) in Tuolumne County, California, United States. The population was 126 at the 2010 census, down from 146 at the 2000 census. It lies in the grassy foothills of the Sierra Nevada near the southern end of California's Gold Country. 

Chinese Camp is California Historical Landmark #423, since 1949.

Geography
Chinese Camp is located at  (37.870294, −120.433526).

Natural history
Wilderness near Chinese Camp is the location of the last remaining known population of the federally listed threatened plant species Brodiaea pallida, the Chinese Camp brodiaea.

History

Chinese Camp is the remnant of a notable California Gold Rush mining town. Between 1849 and 1882, thousands of Chinese immigrants arrived in the area to look for good fortune on the legendary “Gold Mountain.”

The settlement was first known as "Camp Washington" or "Washingtonville" and one of the few remaining streets is Washington Street. Some of the very first Chinese laborers arriving in California in 1849 were driven from neighboring Camp Salvado and resettled here, and the area started to become known as "Chinee" or "Chinese Camp" or "Chinese Diggings". At one point, the town was home to an estimated 5,000 Chinese.

The Chinese Camp post office was established in the general store on April 18, 1854. This building is currently vacant, and a post office is in operation on a plot of land rented from a local resident.

An 1892 Tuolumne County history indicates that, in 1856, four of the six Chinese companies (protective associations) had agents here and that the first tong war (between the Sam Yap and Yan Woo tongs) was fought near here when the population of the area totaled several thousand. The actual location is several miles away, past the 'red hills', near the junction of Red Hills Road and J-59.

An 1860 diary says Chinese Camp was the metropolis for the mining district, with many urban comforts. While placer mining had played out in much of the Gold Country by the early 1860s, it was still active here as late as 1870. An 1899 mining bulletin listed the total gold production of the area as near US$2.5 million.

Chinese Camp is the location and subject of California Historical Landmark #423, dedicated on March 4, 1949. The Saint Francis Xavier Roman Catholic Church, established in 1855, making it the oldest church in the county. The church was renovated in 1949, by John Nicolini but has since fallen into disrepair. The church itself is owned by the Stockton archdiocese.

The current Chinese Camp School is very distinctive, having been designed by Dolores Nicolini in the style of a Chinese pagoda. This school has been in operation since 1970. Previously, the school was in a building near the church. This building was lost in a fire on May 4, 2006.

Demographics

2010
At the 2010 census Chinese Camp had a population of 126. The racial makeup of Chinese Camp was 92 (73%) White, 0 African American, 7 (6%) Native American, 0 Asian, 0 Pacific Islander, 16 (13%) from other races, and 11 (9%) from two or more races. Hispanic or Latino of any race were 25 people (20%).

The whole population lived in households, no one lived in non-institutionalized group quarters and no one was institutionalized. 0 lived in non-institutionalized group quarters, and 0 were institutionalized.

There were 50 households, 15 (30%) had children under the age of 18 living in them, 23 (46%) were opposite-sex married couples living together, 2 (4%) had a female householder with no husband present, 6 (12%) had a male householder with no wife present.  There were 5 (10%) unmarried opposite-sex partnerships, and 1 (2%) same-sex married couples or partnerships. 15 households (30%) were one person and 6 (12%) had someone living alone who was 65 or older. The average household size was 2.5.  There were 31 families (62% of households); the average family size was 3.2.

The age distribution was 30 people (24%) under the age of 18, 11 people (9%) aged 18 to 24, 24 people (19%) aged 25 to 44, 46 people (37%) aged 45 to 64, and 15 people (12%) who were 65 or older.  The median age was 43.5 years. For every 100 females, there were 106.6 males.  For every 100 females age 18 and over, there were 108.7 males.

There were 60 housing units at an average density of 66.6 per square mile, of the occupied units 36 (72.0%) were owner-occupied and 14 (28.0%) were rented. The homeowner vacancy rate was 3%; the rental vacancy rate was 0%.  99 people (79% of the population) lived in owner-occupied housing units and 27 people (21%) lived in rental housing units.

2000

At the 2000 census there were 146 people, 57 households, and 38 families in the CDP. The racial makeup of the CDP was 92% White, 1% African American, 3% Native American, 1% Asian, 1% from other races, and 2% from two or more races. Hispanic or Latino of any race were 12%.

Of the 57 households 32% had children under the age of 18 living with them, 54% were married couples living together, 12% had a female householder with no husband present, and 32% were non-families. 30% of households were one person and 9% were one person aged 65 or older. The average household size was 2.6 and the average family size was 3.2.

The age distribution was 28% under the age of 18, 10% from 18 to 24, 32% from 25 to 44, 20% from 45 to 64, and 10% 65 or older. The median age was 35 years. For every 100 females, there were 117.9 males. For every 100 females age 18 and over, there were 110.0 males.

The median household income was $31,875 and the median family income  was $35,833. Males had a median income of $25,833 versus $18,750 for females. The per capita income for the CDP was $11,501. There were 21% of families and 23% of the population living below the poverty line, including 36% of under eighteens and 14% of those over 64.

Government

Montezuma
Montezuma just north of Chinese Camp is a California Historical Landmark. The Montezuma is a current tungsten mine at an elevation of 9,439 feet.
	
A marker is on California State Route 49, the California Historical Landmark number 122 reads:
	
NO. 122 MONTEZUMA - First record of Montezuma was June 1850 when partners Solomon Miller and Peter K. Aurand, proprietors of the 'Montezuma Tent,' were attacked and Aurand killed by a group of Mexicans during the foreign miners tax excitement of that period. Due to the lack of water, little mining occurred here until 1852 when a ditch and flume were completed bringing water for placer mining. Two types of mining were carried on, placer operations on the flats and tunnels extending under Table Mountain. The gravel produced 3-1/2 C. per pan in the mid 50s. The yield was from $5 to $10 per day. One placer nugget found in 1853 weighed 18 lbs. 8 oz. By late 1852 the population was about 800. At its zenith Montezuma City had four saloons, two hotels, Adams Express Co., post office, church, some homes, and many tents and cabins. The town was nearly destroyed by an incendiary fire which started in Clarks Hotel on June 29, 1866.

See also
California Historical Landmarks in Tuolumne County, California

References

External links

Photographic virtual tour of Chinese Camp.
Note: Although interesting, many of the descriptions are inaccurate and several prominent landmarks are omitted.
Western Ghost Towns
Chinese Camp history

Census-designated places in Tuolumne County, California
Mining communities of the California Gold Rush
Chinese-American history
Populated places established in 1849
1849 establishments in California
Census-designated places in California
California Historical Landmarks